is a Japanese comedy manga series written and illustrated by Masao. It was adapted into an anime television series in 2013.

Ascendent Animation produced an English dub of the anime.

Plot
Ishida & Asakura focuses on the title characters—the stoic Ishida and the lecherous Asakura—and the bizarre students and teachers that populate their high school. Asakura is obsessed with curvaceous women and dreams of becoming a teacher in order to be surrounded by attractive girls all day. Ishida dreams of running a flower shop together with Asakura after they finish high school, and appears to have strong homosexual feelings for his best friend, although this is always played for laughs.

Characters

He is the main character of the story, a high school student who dreams of becoming a teacher. However, his motives are far from pure, as Asakura is obsessed with breasts and wishes to become a teacher so he can constantly be surrounded by attractive female students. Asakura has an afro and speaks with a slight stutter. In class, there is constant competition for Asakura's attention between his best friend Ishida and fellow student Yamada.

 
Asakura's best friend is a tall and stoic young man who speaks in a strong, serious tone. He dreams of opening a flower shop with Asakura after they graduate high school, and reacts violently whenever Yamada tries to get Asakura's attention. Because of his constant blushing whenever he speaks to Asakura, it is assumed that he has homosexual feelings for his best friend.

 
Yamada is a classmate of Ishida and Asakura, with the appearance of a stereotypical nerd, wearing thick glasses and having prominent buck-teeth. Yamada dreams of opening a bookstore with Asakura, but Ishida violently "kills" him in a slapstick fashion every time the subject is brought up; Yamada will always appear unharmed in the next episode. He is a mechanical genius and once built a robot version of himself to fight Ishida.

Media

Manga

Anime
An anime television series, directed by Pippuya and produced by Dax Production and Hotline, started airing on January 6, 2013, until March 24, 2013, running for a total of 12 episodes. The series had been licensed for simulcast streaming on Crunchyroll. The opening theme is "Doki Doki Doku" by Rayli. The anime was released on DVD on July 13, 2021, by Ascendant Animation.

Episode list

References

External links
Official website 

2011 manga
2013 anime television series debuts
Anime series based on manga
Comedy anime and manga
Seinen manga
Shōnen Gahōsha manga